Tomás de Mercado (1525–1575) was a Spanish Dominican friar and both an economist and a theologian, best known for his book Summa de Tratos y Contratos ("Manual of Deals and Contracts") of 1571.  Together with Martín de Azpilcueta he founded the economic tradition of "Iberian monetarism"; both form part of the general intellectual tradition often known as "Late Scholasticism", or the School of Salamanca.

He was either born in Seville or possibly Mexico, where he joined the Dominicans as a young man, becoming lecturer in Arts in the Priory in Mexico City, before returning to study at Salamanca University, where he then became a lecturer in philosophy, moral theology and law.  He then worked in the Exchange House of Seville, the centre of Spain's international money-flows.  He died at sea on a voyage returning to Mexico.

Mercado became more widely known outside the Spanish-speaking world after he was discussed by Joseph Schumpeter in his History of Economic Analysis, published posthumously, ed. Elisabeth Boody Schumpeter, in 1954.  With the strong revival of monetarist economics since then, he has attracted further scholarly attention.

Mercado's Summa
The Summa was an expanded edition of a work first published in 1569 as De los tratos de India y tratantes en ellas. It was written for businessmen as well as scholars and contains many general digressions on social issues, often in very lively language.   Azpilcueta, a few years before, was the first to link the price revolution that was affecting Spain to the influx of American gold, and Mercado extended this analysis, remarking that:  "High prices ruined Spain as the prices attracted Asian commodities and the silver currency flowed out to pay for them. The streets of Manila in the Spanish territories of the Philippines could be paved with granite cobblestone brought from China as ballast in Chinese ships coming to get silver for China".

He devotes much thought to the concept of the fair or "just price", analysing it in terms of wheat, and strongly supporting the tasa or fixed price set by the government on social and ethical grounds, even if it meant producers selling at a loss.

Mercado devoted a chapter to the African slave trade, of which he was highly critical, seeing clearly that the concept of "just enslavement" did not reflect the practice of the actual trade.  However he regarded it as acceptable for Europeans to buy slaves enslaved by Africans, and accepted the enslavement of captives in war, those sentenced for crimes, or children sold by their parents from necessity.

Notes

References
Baeck, Louis, The Mediterranean tradition in economic thought, Routledge, 1994, google books
"Companion": Nuccetelli, Susana; Schutte, Orfelia; Bueno, Otavio; A Companion to Latin American Philosophy, John Wiley and Sons, 2009, google books
Gallardo, Alexander, Spanish Economics in the Sixteenth Century: Theory, Policy, and Practice, Universe, 2002, google books

External links
 Summa de Tratos y Contratos (PDF in Spanish)

1575 deaths
People from Seville
Spanish economists
16th-century Spanish Roman Catholic theologians
Spanish Dominicans
1525 births
University of Salamanca alumni
School of Salamanca